Pirbuterol (trade name Maxair) is a short-acting β2 adrenoreceptor agonist with bronchodilating action used in the treatment of asthma, available (as pirbuterol acetate) as a breath-activated metered-dose inhaler.

It was patented in 1971 and came into medical use in 1983.

Medical use
Pirbuterol is used in asthma for reversal of acute bronchospasm, and also as a maintenance medication to prevent future attacks. It should be used in patients 12 years of age and older with or without concurrent theophylline and/or inhaled corticosteroid.

Mode of action

Pharmacokinetics
After inhalation of doses up to 800 μg (twice the maximum recommended dose) systemic blood levels of pirbuterol are below the limit of assay sensitivity (2–5 ng/ml). A mean of 51% of the dose is recovered in urine as pirbuterol plus its sulfate conjugate following administration by aerosol. Pirbuterol is not metabolized by catechol-O-methyltransferase. The plasma half-life measured after oral administration is about two hours.

Adverse effects

References

External links 
 RxList: Maxair (Pirbuterol)

Phenylethanolamines
Beta2-adrenergic agonists
Pyridines